Crypton is a JavaScript library that allows one to write web applications where the server knows nothing of the contents a user is storing. This is done by use of cryptography, though the developer of the application does not need any cryptographic knowledge. It is designed to encrypt data inside a JavaScript context (either a browser extension, mobile application, or WebKit-based desktop application).

Crypton was created by SpiderOak, also known for their encrypted backup product, who were looking for a way for data to be securely encrypted without the need for users to download a separate program.

See also

References

External links

Source code on GitHub

JavaScript libraries
Web frameworks
Software using the GNU AGPL license